Francesco De Francesco (born 21 September 1977, in Tortora) is a retired Italian professional footballer who played as a striker.

He played 19 games in the 1997–98 season for U.S. Lecce in the Italian Serie A.

He represented the Italy U-17 side at the 1993 FIFA U-17 World Championship.

External links
 

1977 births
Living people
Italian footballers
Italy youth international footballers
Serie A players
Serie B players
Serie C players
A.C. Milan players
A.C. Prato players
U.S. Lecce players
Cosenza Calcio 1914 players
U.S. Salernitana 1919 players
Treviso F.B.C. 1993 players
Genoa C.F.C. players
Como 1907 players
S.P.A.L. players
U.S. Cremonese players
Association football forwards